Daniele Giordano (born 4 March 1991) is an Italian footballer who plays as a goalkeeper for Afro-Napoli

Club career
He started his career at U.S. Lecce before moving to Celtic in 2008. In 2010, he was loaned to Montrose. In 2011, he returned to Italy for A.C. Perugia Calcio. On 18 July 2013 he was released.

He was signed by Melfi. The club qualified to 2014–15 Serie C as the 6th of Group B of 2013–14 Lega Pro Seconda Divisione.

International career

Representative team
Since he returned to Italy, he was picked by Italy Lega Pro under-20 representative team, a feeder team of the Italian national youth team, for a training camp and practice match. He also played for U-16 and U-17 team (as unused bench) before left for Scotland. He wore no.1 shirt in 2008 UEFA European Under-17 Football Championship elite qualification, but as the backup of Filippo Perucchini, because Simone Colombi left the squad in the final minutes.

References

External links
 
 
 FIGC 
 

Italian footballers
U.S. Lecce players
Celtic F.C. players
Montrose F.C. players
A.C. Perugia Calcio players
A.S. Melfi players
Expatriate footballers in Scotland
Italian expatriate footballers
Italian expatriate sportspeople in Scotland
Scottish Football League players
Serie C players
Association football goalkeepers
Italy youth international footballers
1991 births
Living people